Terrence Boss (born September 1, 1981) is a retired professional soccer goalkeeper and a collegiate soccer coach.

Career

College and Amateur
Boss played college soccer for the University of Tulsa from 2000–2004, starting 20 games, and also featured for Cascade Surge, Vermont Voltage and Fort Wayne Fever in the USL Premier Development League.

Professional
Boss began his professional career in the 2005 season with the Charlotte Eagles in the USL Second Division. In 2006, he moved to the Puerto Rico Islanders in the USL First Division, serving as the club's backup goalkeeper. In 2008 Boss returned to Charlotte and was the starting goalkeeper for a team that finished in first place in USL2, before losing in the league's title game to the Cleveland City Stars. He led USL-2 in wins (11) and shutouts (9). He was named the USL2's Goalkeeper of the Year for 2008.

Boss signed with the New York Red Bulls on September 15, 2008, but suffered a torn posterior cruciate ligament as the team was preparing for its playoff run and never played for the team. He was waived by New York on May 27, 2009.

On June 26, 2009, Boss signed with Seattle Sounders FC. Boss made his Sounders FC debut against Chelsea in a friendly. He played the whole second half and made a few good saves.

He made his MLS debut on April 22, 2010 in the Sounders' game against FC Dallas as a second-half substitute for an injured Kasey Keller.

On November 30, 2011, Boss was forced to retire due to a history of concussions.

International
Boss's stay with the Puerto Rico Islanders helped him to qualify to play for the Puerto Rico national football team. Boss earned a shutout in his first international cap for Puerto Rico in a 1–0 victory over the Dominican Republic in a World Cup Qualifier in March 2008.

Coaching 
Boss spent 4 seasons on the coaching staff at University of Virginia. In December 2017 it was announced he would take over as head coach for the Men's Team at Oregon State University. His first season saw him earn Pac-12 Coach Of The Year honors for the 2018 season.

In January 2019, it was announced that Boss would join the US Men's National Team's January training camp as a coach.

Boss would continue his work with the US Men's National Team during the 2019 Gold Cup campaign.

Boss departed Oregon State in December 2022 to pursue a position in professional soccer.

Honors

Charlotte Eagles
USL Second Division Championship (1):  2005

Seattle Sounders FC
 Lamar Hunt U.S. Open Cup (2): 2010, 2011

Personal
A Philomath, Oregon, native, Boss is married to Hannah. His brother, Kevin, won a Super Bowl championship as a tight end with the New York Giants and also played for the Oakland Raiders and Kansas City Chiefs.

References

External links
 
 
 

1981 births
Living people
Association football goalkeepers
Cascade Surge players
Fort Wayne Fever players
Vermont Voltage players
Charlotte Eagles players
Puerto Rico Islanders players
New York Red Bulls players
Seattle Sounders FC players
Puerto Rican footballers
Puerto Rico international footballers
Oregon State Beavers men's soccer coaches
USL League Two players
USL Second Division players
USL First Division players
Major League Soccer players
Tulsa Golden Hurricane men's soccer players
People from Philomath, Oregon
Soccer players from Oregon
American soccer coaches
Virginia Cavaliers men's soccer coaches